The University of Queensland Handball Club is based in Brisbane, Queensland, Australia. The club has been affiliated with the University of Queensland since 1992. Many players are international University of Queensland students but the club is open to non-students also. The club mascot is the UQ Tiger.

Club history 
The University of Queensland Handball Club was founded in 1992. They have won the Queensland Handball League nine times, most recently in 2014 and the Australian Club Championship once. They have also participated in the Australian University Games placing 2nd in Division 2 in 2011  and 2nd in Division 1 in 2013.

In 2019, the women's team represented Australia at the first ever IHF Women's Super Globe in Wuxi, China placing seventh out of eight clubs competing. They qualified by winning the National Championship on the Gold Coast in June.

See also

 Queensland Handball League
 Australian Handball Club Championship
 Handball League Australia

References

External links 
 Official Website(English)
 UQ Sport website

Sport at the University of Queensland
Sporting clubs in Brisbane
Australian handball clubs
Handball clubs established in 1992
1992 establishments in Australia
University and college sports clubs in Australia